Twin Buttes (Hidatsa: Idarúhxa Arucúhgaru Maa’ú’sh or cuuk gaamaaʔuush; Mandan: Tííru’pa Pshíí Wóónis) is an unincorporated community in Dunn County, North Dakota, United States. It is a community on the Fort Berthold Indian Reservation, which is home of the Mandan, Hidatsa, and Arikara Three Affiliated Tribes.

References

Unincorporated communities in Dunn County, North Dakota
Unincorporated communities in North Dakota
Mandan, Hidatsa, and Arikara Nation